West Suwon Bus Terminal is the second-largest bus station in Suwon, a city in South Korea's north-west province of Gyeonggi-do.  The station is located in Gwonseon-gu, 3.1km north-west of Suwon Station.  Standing beside a branch of E-Mart, it is not to be confused with Suwon Bus Terminal, which is located adjacent to a different branch of the same store.

Buses
There are direct buses from West Suwon Bus Terminal to the following places.

Chungcheong
Boryeong (Daecheon Beach); Eumseong; Jincheon

Gangwon-do
Cheorwon; Chuncheon; Hwacheon

Gyeonggi-do
Anseong; Gapyeong; Namyangju; Osan; Pocheon

Gyeongsang
North Daegu; Pohang

Jeolla
Jeonju (from February 24, 2008)

Management
The bus station, unusually in South Korea, is run by a private company, namely Hantur D&D Co. Ltd. (Hangeul: 한터디앤디) in cooperation with Suwon City Council.

References

External links
 West Suwon Bus Terminal
 Bus Terminals in Gyeonggi-do
 Express Bus Lines Association

Buildings and structures in Suwon
Transport in Suwon
Bus stations in South Korea